Dormition of the Theotokos Church, or Dormition of the Mother of God Church may refer to:

Albania
Dormition Cathedral, Berat
Dormition Church, Sopik
Dormition of the Theotokos Church, Labovë e Kryqit

Bulgaria
 Cathedral Church of the Dormition of the Holy Mother of God (Bogoroditsa), Plovdiv
 Dormition of the Theotokos Church, Targovishte
 Dormition of the Theotokos Cathedral, Varna

Croatia
 Church of the Dormition of the Theotokos, Negoslavci

France
 Église de la Dormition-de-la-Mère-de-Dieu, Sainte-Geneviève-des-Bois

Georgia
 Lykhny Church, Lykhny (Abkhazia)
 Tbilisi Sioni Cathedral

Greece
 Church of the Pantanassa, Athens
 Protaton in Karyes, Mount Athos

Israel
 Abbey of the Dormition, Jerusalem

North Macedonia
Dormition of the Theotokos Church, Novo Selo, Štip

Poland 
 Dormition Church, Dubiny

Romania
 Dormition of the Theotokos Cathedral, Cluj-Napoca
 Dormition of the Theotokos Cathedral, Giurgiu
 Dormition of the Theotokos Cathedral, Satu Mare
 Dormition of the Theotokos Church, Alba Iulia
 Dormition of the Theotokos Church, Constanța
 Dormition of the Theotokos Church, Focșani
 Donie Church, Focșani
 Dormition of the Theotokos Church, Orăștie
 Dormition of the Theotokos Church, Sighetu Marmației
 Dormition of the Theotokos Church, Strei
 Dormition of the Theotokos Church, Zalău

Russia
 Dormition Church, Kondopoga, a wooden church built in 1774 which burned in 2018
 Church of the Dormition of the Mother of God (Saint Petersburg)

Ukraine
 Pyrohoshcha Dormition of the Mother of God Church, Kiev
 Dormition Church, Lviv

United Kingdom
 The Greek Orthodox Cathedral of the Dormition of the Mother of God, Wood Green, London

See also
 Cathedral of the Dormition of the Theotokos (disambiguation)
 Monastery of the Dormition of the Theotokos (disambiguation)
 Cathedral of the Theotokos (disambiguation)
 Dormition of the Theotokos (disambiguation)
 Dormition (disambiguation)
 Assumption (disambiguation)
 Church of the Assumption (disambiguation)
 Cathedral of the Assumption (disambiguation)